John Newsam is a British materials scientist, business innovator and entrepreneur, and adjunct professor at UC San Diego.

Education
John Newsam received a BA Hons and MA degrees in Chemistry from Oxford University and a DPhil in Solid State Chemistry at Oxford in 1980.

Work
As a materials scientist, Newsam has authored over 170 scientific publications, on topics such as zeolites, crystallography, materials simulation and high throughput experimentation, and is an inventor on 9 issued US patents; he has lectured extensively, and been recognized by several awards, including the Corday-Morgan Medal, and by election as a Fellow of the American Association for the Advancement of Science.

As a business innovator and entrepreneur, Newsam has to date co-founded six companies: Tioga Research, Inc. (in 2011), Bio4Front, Inc. (in 2008), fqubed (in 2002, acquired by Nuvo Research in 2005), Integrated Discovery Sciences Corporation (in 2001, acquired by Bio and Gene in 2005), the Aktiengesellschaft (in 1999, acquired by BASF in 2008), and FreedomVoice Systems (in 1996). Newsam has delivered undergraduate courses on entrepreneurship and business innovation at UC San Diego, and has served as an adjunct professor at both UC Santa Barbara (Materials Department) and UCSD (Chemistry & Biochemistry Department).

Awards and honors
Newsam has received many awards and honors both as an individual and together with colleagues, including:
 2012: Fellow, American Association for the Advancement of Science
 2009: Bronze Edison Award, Science & Medical Category (for Insight, with colleagues at Nuvo Research)
 2003: Fellow, Royal Society of Chemistry
 2001: Wissenschaftpreis 2001 des Stifterverbandes (together with the other co-founders of the Aktiengesellschaft)
 1997: Award for Excellence in Catalysis (Catalysis Society of Metropolitan NY)
 1989: Corday-Morgan Prize and Medal 
 1986: Sidhu Award (awarded by Pittsburgh Diffraction Society)

References

Living people
Alumni of the University of Oxford
British chemists
Year of birth missing (living people)